Tevi Steve Lawson (born 8 August 1994) is a professional footballer who plays as a midfielder for Hamilton Academical. Born in France, he represents the Togo national team.

Club career
Lawson began his career in the lower divisions of France, before moving to Switzerland with Le Mont. After Le Mont's bankruptcy, Lawson moved to Neuchâtel Xamax on July 2017. After a trial spell, Lawson signed for Scottish club Livingston in August 2018. He departed the club in 2021.

On 27 January 2022, Lawson signed for Scottish Championship side Hamilton Academical.

International career
Born in France to Togolese parents, Lawson was called up to the Togo national team in August 2017. He made his debut in a friendly 2–0 win over Niger on 2 September 2017.

Career statistics

References

External links

SFL Profile

1994 births
Living people
People from Mantes-la-Jolie
Footballers from Yvelines
Association football defenders
Citizens of Togo through descent
Togolese footballers
Togo international footballers
French footballers
French sportspeople of Togolese descent
Championnat National players
Swiss Challenge League players
Scottish Professional Football League players
Vannes OC players
Saint-Colomban Sportive Locminé players
Neuchâtel Xamax FCS players
Livingston F.C. players
Hamilton Academical F.C. players
Togolese expatriate footballers
French expatriate footballers
Togolese expatriate sportspeople in Switzerland
French expatriate sportspeople in Switzerland
Expatriate footballers in Switzerland
French expatriate sportspeople in Scotland
Expatriate footballers in Scotland